Bexleybus was an English bus operator. A subsidiary of Selkent, it was established as a low cost operator. It operated services under contract to London Regional Transport from January 1988 until January 1991.

History
Bexleybus was formed by Selkent as a low cost operator to operate tendered services in the Bexleyheath and Woolwich areas. With London Buses having to tender for routes as part of the London Regional Transport Act 1984, low cost units were established with the hope that reduced costs would allow them to be able to competitively bid.

Bexleybus commenced operating on 16 January 1988 operating 17 routes with 107 buses from a reopened Bexleyheath garage. Routes operated included 96, 99, 178, 229, 269, 272, 401, 422, 469, and 492. Buses included new leased Leyland Olympians and reactivated Daimler Fleetlines and Leyland Nationals.

However the operation was beset with industrial unrest, and in October 1988 routes 422 and 492 were transferred to Boro'line Maidstone.

Bexleybus ceased after losing its routes when re-tendered in January 1991 with the garage passing to London Central.

References

1988 establishments in England
1991 disestablishments in England
Former London bus operators